Brent Alan Meeke (born April 10, 1952) is a Canadian retired professional ice hockey forward who played 75 games in the National Hockey League for the Cleveland Barons and California Golden Seals between 1972 and 1977. He later served as the head coach for the College of Wooster Fighting Scots ACHA men's ice hockey team from 2014 to 2017.

Meeke was born in Toronto, Ontario. As a youth, he played in the 1964 Quebec International Pee-Wee Hockey Tournament with the Toronto Shopsy's minor ice hockey team.

Career statistics

Regular season and playoffs

References

External links
 

1952 births
Living people
Adler Mannheim players
California Golden Seals draft picks
California Golden Seals players
Canadian ice hockey forwards
Cleveland Barons (NHL) players
Niagara Falls Flyers players
Phoenix Roadrunners (WHL) players
Salt Lake Golden Eagles (CHL) players
Salt Lake Golden Eagles (WHL) players
Ice hockey people from Toronto